Every Beating Second is a large netted sculpture designed by artist Janet Echelman. The sculpture is located in Terminal 2 of the San Francisco International Airport, which opened in April 2011.  The piece is composed of three separate netted structures, each connected to a skylight, hanging from the ceiling of the terminal.

Design
The sculpture consists of several elements. Three net structures hang from the ceiling  under skylights designed to cast shadows of the nets on the floor. The terrazzo flooring is part of the work, and is designed to look like shadows of each net sculpture. At night, the lighting transitions in color from indigo to orange. Computer controlled airflow makes the sculpture and skylight shadows appear to move with the wind.

The nets were created with braided fibers and knotted twine suspended from rings of steel armature. The nets' shapes are designed to look like clouds and reference local weather patterns and microclimates. The colors were chosen to be reminiscent of psychedelic music artwork and the Summer of Love, while also reflecting that the bay area as a contemporary hub of innovation and technology.

The title, Every Beating Second, referring to a line by beat poet Allen Ginsberg, represents the artist's interest in heightening awareness of the present moment.

Materials and size 
Materials: Powder-coated steel, colored fiber, skylights, terrazzo floor, computer-programmed airflow, colored lighting

Net 1: 1,663 sq. ft. / 33 ft. length x 39 ft. width x 19 ft. height

Net 2: 1,930 sq. ft. / 30 ft. length x 35 ft. width x 22 ft. height

Net 3: 894 sq. ft. / 18 ft. length x 18 ft. width x 19 ft. height

Total area: approx. 15,000 sq. ft. / 176.5 ft. length x 83.5 ft. depth x 28.5 ft. height

References

External links 

 Every Beating Second  on Janet Echelman's website
 Terminal 2 on SFO website
 Airport Art Is Not an Oxymoron, at Least Not at SFO on The New York Times
 Five New Public Artworks Debut at SFO Terminal 2
 Sculptures Take off at San Francisco International Airport on San Francisco Examiner
Five New Public Artworks on San Francisco Arts Commission
A First Look at SFO's New Terminal 2 on 7x7 Magazine
 "Sculpting Urban Airspace: Janet Echelman", September 2011 Sculpture Magazine
 "6 Most Beautiful U.S. Airport Terminals", on TheStreet.com

Art in San Francisco
2011 sculptures
Abstract sculptures in California
Fabric sculptures
Public art in the United States
San Francisco International Airport